Gargina is a genus of butterflies in the family Lycaenidae. The species of this genus are found  in the Neotropical realm.

Species
Gargina gargophia (Hewitson, 1877)
Gargina thyesta (Hewitson, 1869)
Gargina caninius (Druce, 1907)
Gargina gnosia (Hewitson, 1868)
Gargina emessa (Hewitson, 1867)
Gargina humber (Schaus, 1902)
Gargina thoria (Hewitson, 1869)
Gargina panchaea (Hewitson, 1869)

External links
"Gargina Robbins, 2004" at Markku Savela's Lepidoptera and Some Other Life Forms

Eumaeini
Lycaenidae of South America
Lycaenidae genera